Spas Dzhevizov (born 27 September 1955, in Plovdiv) is a former Bulgarian footballer who played as a  forward. For the Bulgarian national team he featured in 20 games and scored 3 goals.

Between 1976 and 1984 Dzhevizov played in 205 matches and scored 96 goals for CSKA Sofia. Dzhevizov won the top Bulgarian league, the A PFG, four times (all with CSKA), as well as the Bulgarian Cup, two times (all with CSKA). He led the league in scoring during the 1979–80 season with 23 goals.

Following his playing career, Dzhevizov became a manager of clubs in Bulgaria and Cyprus, including CSKA Sofia and Alki Larnaca.

Honours 
 CSKA Sofia
 A Group: 1980, 1981, 1982, 1983
 Bulgarian Cup: 1981, 1983
 AC Omonia
 Cypriot League: 1985, 1987

Individual
 Bulgarian League Top Scorer: 1980 (with 23 goals)
 Cypriot League Top Scorer: 1987 (with 32 goals)

References

External links
 

1955 births
Living people
Bulgarian footballers
Bulgaria international footballers
Bulgarian expatriate footballers
Botev Plovdiv players
PFC CSKA Sofia players
AC Omonia players
PFC Minyor Pernik players
First Professional Football League (Bulgaria) players
Cypriot First Division players
Expatriate footballers in Cyprus
Bulgarian expatriate sportspeople in Cyprus
Bulgarian football managers
AC Omonia managers
PFC CSKA Sofia managers
Footballers from Plovdiv
Association football forwards